Frédéric Boyer (born 2 March 1961, Cannes) is a French author of novels, poems, essays, and translations.

Biography
A former student of the École normale supérieure de Fontenay Saint-Cloud, he coordinated the Bible Nouvelle Traduction (Bayard, 2001), with Olivier Cadiot, Jean Echenoz, Florence Delay, Jacques Roubaud, and others. He proposed new translations of the Confessions by Augustine of Hippo for which he was awarded the Prix Jules Janin of the Académie française (Les aveux, P.O.L., 2008) as well as Richard II, P.O.L 2010 and Shakespeare's sonnets, P.O.L., 2010).

He is also the president of Tetra Media Studios, best known in the Anglophone world for the television drama series A French Village. He is currently the literary director of Éditions P.O.L. He assumed this position in 2018 after the death of the publishing house's founding editor, Paul Otchakovsky-Laurens.

Works 

1991: La Consolation
1992: En prison
1993: Des choses idiotes et douces, Prix du Livre Inter
1993: Comprendre et compatir
1994: Comme des anges
1995: Le dieu qui était mort si jeune
1995: Est-ce que tu m'aimes ?
1995: Les Innocents
1995: L'ennemi d'amour
1996: Arrière, fantômes !
1996: Dieu, le sexe et nous
1997: Notre faute
1998: Le Vertige des blondes
1999: Le Goût du suicide lent
1999: Pas aimée
2000: Kids
2000: Une fée
2002: Gagmen
2002: La Bible, notre exil
2003: Songs
2003: Mauvais vivants
2004: Mes amis mes amis
2004: « Nous nous aimons »
2005: Abraham remix
2006: Patraque
2008: Vaches
2009: Orphée
2009: Hammurabi Hammurabi
2010: Techniques de l'amour
2012: Phèdre les oiseaux
2013: Rappeler Roland
2014: Dans ma prairie
2015: Quelle terreur en nous ne veut pas finir ?
2015: Kâmasûtra
2016: Les Yeux noirs
2017: Là où le coeur attend
2018: peut-être pas immortelle
2020: Sous l'éclat des flèches
2020: Jésus : l'histoire d'une parole (Illustrated by Serge Bloch)

References

External links 
 Frédéric Boyer on Éditions P.O.L
 Frédéric Boyer : "Il y a trop de fausse érudition dans le débat français" on Journal du Dimanche
 Frédéric Boyer on Babelio
 Frédéric Boyer on France Culture
 Frédéric Boyer on France Inter
 Frédéric Boyer, chaman chrétien on Le Monde (26 April 2012)
 Frédéric Boyer on the site of the Académie française

20th-century French non-fiction writers
20th-century French male writers
21st-century French non-fiction writers
ENS Fontenay-Saint-Cloud-Lyon alumni
French Roman Catholic writers
Prix du Livre Inter winners
People from Cannes
1961 births
Living people
French male non-fiction writers